Kazi Shuvo (December 10, 1983) is a Bangladeshi singer.

Life and career
Kazi Ashiqur Rahman, nicknamed  Kazi Shuvo, was born on 10 December 1983 to  Kazi Shah Alam and Fatema Khatun, in Bijoypur village, Gournadi thana in Barisal district. Shuvo is youngest among two brothers and a sister. He has been brought up in the midst of songs and music since childhood.

His initiation in music was through his father's hands, in tabla. Institutionally he learnt playing tabla first from “Esho Gaan Shikhi” in Khulna and then from “Udichi”. Shuvo was in Khulna as his father was in service in Eastern Jute Mills Ltd. Khulna. Although Shuvo had just learnt playing tabla he had a great fascination with singing. His elder brother Kazi Atikur Rahman's singing would inspire him, from whose diary he memorized many songs.

Shuvo then came to Dhaka for his graduation. Gradually he started singing songs on stage. At times he would play tabla. But his dream, singing, remained unfulfilled, until he suddenly met Shahid Vi of the band Durbin at Dhanmondi-8. Shahid vi told him that, “You sing folk song well. You can join Durbin.”

In 2009, with Shahid vi's inspiration, Kazi Shuvo's solo album Shada Mata was released, with Arfin Rumey's composition. The folk songs in the album: "Sona Bou", "Tumi Bine Akul Poran", "Ojhor Shrabon", "Nilima", etc. After that Shuvo sang in different mixed albums. A song titled  "Mon Pajor."

In 2012 Shuvo's 2nd solo album Shada Mata-2 was released, again with Arfin Rumi's composition. In 2013 he released another album, named Moner akash. In 2014 Shuvo's 3rd solo album Shada Mata-3 was released. This album was composed by Arfin Rumey and Rafi. “Diwana”, “Amar Bondhu”, “Tomar O Pirite  Bondhu”. His 4th album Daga was released on the occasion of Eid-ul-Fitr in the year 2016. His 5th album Mayar agun was released on the occasion of the Eid-ul-Azha in the same year.

Awards
Kazi Shuvo achieved  BEST SINGER on Saco Telefilm award 2014.
Kazi Shuvo achieved  BEST SINGER on Artist Journalist Foundation of Bangladesh music award for music album "ShadaMata 2" 2014
Kazi Shuvo achieved  BEST SINGER on Artist Journalist Foundation of Bangladesh music award for music album "Mayar Agun" 2016.
Kazi Shuvo achieved  BEST SINGER on DCRU showbiz award for music album "Daaga" 2016.

Discography
Shadamata - 2009
Shadamata 2 - 2012
Shadamata 3 - 2014
Mayar Agun - 2016 
  Daaga - 2016

Mixed album 
 Toke Sara Raat
 Tin Pagol
 Anonder Gaan
 Dukkho Boli
 Saat Jonom 
 Nilanjona
 Love Duets
 Jonom Jonom
 doobin 3.01 
 Ridoy  jurey 
 Na bola valobasha, 
 Maya Jhinai bondhu 
 Ichchedana 
 Rodela akash 
 Buker pakhi 
 Wada 
 Trivuj prem 
 Pappunno 
 tui amar sob
Premer Khela - Moni Chowdhury

Movie song list 
Dure Dure Thaka - Lal Tip
Pirates of the Blood Secret

References

External links
Kazi Shuvo Official Website

Living people
Bangladeshi singers
Bangladeshi composers
Bangladeshi male singers
Laser Vision artists
1983 births